John Mundy is a Canadian diplomat. He was Ambassador Extraordinary and Plenipotentiary to Iran and previously a diplomat to Australia. Mundy was expelled by Iran on December 4, 2007, after the Canadian and Iranian governments failed to agree on an reciprocal exchange of Ambassadors.  Mr Mundy retired from Government service in 2008 and joined the Centre for International Policy Studies at the University of Ottawa as an Associate in 2012. He has written and lectured about Iran extensively.

References

External links 
 Foreign Affairs and International Trade Canada diplomatic history
 Canadian ambassador to Iran expelled: Bernier

Living people
Year of birth missing (living people)
Place of birth missing (living people)
Ambassadors of Canada to Iran